Andrew Whitehurst is a British visual effects artist. Best known for his works in Troy (2004), Charlie and the Chocolate Factory (2005), Harry Potter and the Order of the Phoenix (2007) and Ex Machina (2015).

In 2016, Whitehurst received an Academy Award for Best Visual Effects for his work on the film Ex Machina. He shared the award with Sara Bennett, Paul Norris, and Mark Williams Ardington.

References

External links

Living people
Special effects people
Year of birth missing (living people)
Place of birth missing (living people)
Best Visual Effects Academy Award winners